The Ultimate Collection is a compilation album released by the British rock group Uriah Heep. It features songs from their debut album ...Very 'Eavy ...Very 'Umble through their 1991 album Different World.

Track listing

Disc one
"Gypsy" (Mick Box, David Byron) - 6:38
"Come Away Melinda" (Fred Hellerman, Fran Minkoff) - 3:47
"Bird of Prey" (Box, Byron, Ken Hensley, Paul Newton) - 4:12
"Lady in Black" (Hensley) - 4:42
"Look at Yourself" (Hensley) - 5:08
"July Morning" (Byron, Hensley) - 10:32
"The Wizard" (Hensley, Mark Clarke) - 2:59
"Easy Livin'" (Hensley) - 2:36
"Sunrise" (Hensley) - 4:03
"The Magician's Birthday" (Box, Hensley, Lee Kerslake) - 10:18
"Sweet Lorraine" (Box, Byron, Gary Thain) - 4:14
"Stealin'" (Hensley) - 4:48
"Sweet Freedom" (Hensley) - 6:34
"Wonderworld" (Hensley) - 4:29
"Something or Nothing" (Box, Hensley, Thain) - 2:55

Disc two
"Return to Fantasy" (Hensley, Byron) - 5:41
"Prima Donna" (Byron, Box, Kerslake, Hensley) - 3:08
"One Way or Another" (Hensley) - 4:38
"Wise Man" (Hensley) - 4:39
"Free Me" (Hensley) - 3:30
"Free and Easy" (John Lawton, Box) - 3:03
"Come Back to Me" (Kerslake, Hensley) - 4:17
"Fallen Angel" (Hensley) - 4:57
"Feelings" (Hensley) - 5:19
"Too Scared to Run" (Box, Bob Daisley, Peter Goalby, Kerslake, John Sinclair) - 3:48
"On the Rebound" (Russ Ballard) - 3:12
"Think It Over" (Trevor Bolder, John Sloman) - 3:34
"That's the Way It Is" (Paul Bliss) - 4:07
"The Other Side of Midnight" (Box, Daisley, Goalby, Kerslake, Sinclair) - 3:55
"Stay on Top" (Tom Jackson) - 3:35
"Hold Your Head Up" (Rod Argent, Chris White) - 4:30
"Blood Red Roses" (Goalby) - 4:08
"Blood on Stone" (Bolder) - 4:34
"Different World" (Box, Phil Lanzon) - 4:12

Personnel
Mick Box - Lead Guitar, Backing Vocals - All tracks
David Byron - Lead Vocals - (Track 1-17)
Ken Hensley - Keyboards, Hammond Organ, Synths, Guitar, Lead and backing Vocals, - (Track 1-24)
Paul Newton - Bass guitar, Vocals - (Track 1-6)
Alex Napier - Drums - (Track 1 and 2)
Keith Baker - Drums - (Track 3 and 4)
Ian Clarke - Drums - (Track 5 and 6)
Lee Kerslake - Drums, Backing Vocals - (Track 7-23, 25-34)
Mark Clarke - Bass guitar, Vocals - (Track 7)
Gary Thain - Bass guitar - (Track 8-15)
John Wetton - Bass guitar, vocals - (Track 16-18)
John Lawton - Lead vocals - (Track 19-23)
Trevor Bolder - Bass guitar, Backing vocals - (Track 19-24, 31-34)
John Sloman - Lead Vocals - (Track 24)
Chris Slade - Drums - (Track 24)
Bob Daisley - Bass guitar, Backing vocals - (Track 25-30)
Peter Goalby - Lead vocals - (Track 25-30)
John Sinclair - Keyboards, Guitars, Backing vocals - (Track 25-30)
Phil Lanzon - Keyboards, Vocals - (Track 31-34)
Bernie Shaw - Lead vocals - (Track 31-34)

References

2003 compilation albums
Uriah Heep (band) compilation albums
Sanctuary Records compilation albums